Leo Baker may refer to:
 Leo Baker (director)
 Leo Baker (skateboarder)